KLIP (105.3 FM, "LA 105 FM") is a radio station broadcasting a classic hits music format. Licensed to Monroe, Louisiana, United States, the station serves the Monroe area. The station is currently owned by Holladay Broadcasting of Louisiana, LLC.  Studios are located in Monroe, and its transmitter is located in nearby West Monroe, Louisiana.

The station is also a member of the Tom Kent Radio Network, and has a broadcast schedule from 6 pm until 6 am local time on weekdays (may be preempted by sports) with Tom Kent from 6 pm until midnight, Jackie Newton from midnight until 3 am, and Steve Kent from 3 am until 6 am. Also part of the schedule is an area from 9 am until noon on Sundays as part of the Powerline radio show.

References

External links

Radio stations in Louisiana
Classic hits radio stations in the United States
Mass media in Monroe, Louisiana
Radio stations established in 1964
The Radio People radio stations